Enchantress most commonly refers to:
 Enchantress (supernatural), a magician, sorcerer, enchanter, wizard; sometimes called an enchantress, sorceress, or witch if female.
 Enchantress (fantasy), a female  fictional character who uses magic 
 Seduction, the enticement of one person by another, called a seductress or enchantress when it is a beautiful and charismatic woman

Enchantress or The Enchantress may also refer to:

Culture

Opera
 The Enchantress (opera), an opera by Tchaikovsky
 The Enchantress, a 1911 operetta with music by Victor Herbert and book and lyrics by Fred de Gresac and Harry B. Smith

Literature
 "The Enchantress of Venus", a 1949 short story by Leigh Brackett
 Enchantress from the Stars, a 1971 novel by Sylvia Engdahl
 The Enchantress, a 1985 novel by Han Suyin
 The Enchantress of Florence, a 2008 novel by Salman Rushdie
 The Enchantress: The Secrets of the Immortal Nicholas Flamel, a 2012 novel by Michael Scott

Film
 The Enchantress (1909 film) (Russian: Charodeyka), a short film directed by Pyotr Chardynin and Vasily Goncharov 
 Circe, the Enchantress, a 1924 American film directed by Robert Z. Leonard

Fictional characters
 Enchantress (Marvel Comics), a fictional character in the Marvel Comics Universe
 Enchantress (DC Comics), a fictional character in the DC Comics Universe
 Enchantress (He-Man & The Masters of the Universe Cartoon) a fictional character in Mattel Cartoon Series

Gaming
 Aiushtha, a video-game character in Defense of the Ancients, called Enchantress
 Magic: The Gathering, a card game with a creature named Enchantress
 Dungeons & Dragons, a game with a female character class called Enchantress
 EverQuest, a game with a female character class called Enchantress
 Shovel Knight character Shield Knight, while possessed by a cursed amulet, calls herself The Enchantress

Folklore
 Alkonost, a legendary bird in Slavic mythology, with the body of a bird with the head and chest of a woman
 Gamayun, a prophetic bird of Russian folklore, a symbol of wisdom and knowledge, depicted as a large bird with a woman's head.
 Hulder, in Scandinavian folklore, a stunningly beautiful woman with long hair; though from behind she is hollow like an old tree trunk and has an animal's tail
 Lilith, in Jewish folklore, a woman or demon that appears in creation myths; according to one tradition, she left Adam because she refused to be subservient to him
 Melusine, in European folklore, a feminine spirit of fresh waters in sacred springs and rivers, depicted as a woman who is a serpent or fish from the waist down
 Mermaid, in Middle Eastern, Greek and British folklore, a legendary aquatic creature that is a woman above the waist and a fish below
 Mohini, in Hindu mythology, the only female avatar of the god Vishnu, portrayed as a femme fatale, who maddens lovers, sometimes leading them to their doom
 Naiad, in Greek mythology, a type of nymph who presided over fountains, wells, springs, streams, and brooks
 Nereid, in Greek mythology, nymphs associated with freshwater streams and springs, could be dangerous to handsome men, as they were lustful and jealous
 Oceanid, in Greek and Roman mythology, the three thousand daughters of the Titans Oceanus and Tethys, each was the patroness of a particular spring, river, sea, lake or pond
 Ondine, in European folklore, water nymphs found in forest pools and waterfalls, could gain souls by marrying a man and bearing a child
 Oshun, in Yoruba mythology, a goddess who reigns over love, intimacy, beauty, wealth and diplomacy, she is beneficent and kind, but has a terrible temper
 Pincoya, in Chiloean mythology, a cheerful and sensual female water spirit of the Chilotan Seas that is of incomparable beauty and rises from the depths of the sea
 Rusalka, in Slavic mythology, a female ghost, water nymph, succubus or mermaid-like demon that dwells in a waterway, sometimes luring handsome men to their deaths
 Sihuanaba, in South American folklore, a woman cursed by a god, she first appears as a beautiful woman and lures men into gorges, then they see her true hideous form
 Siren, in Greek mythology, three creatures portrayed as bird-women who lured sailors with their enchanting voices to shipwreck on the rocky coast of their island
 Sirin, Russian versions of the Sirens, portrayed with the head and chest of a beautiful woman and the body of a bird, usually an owl, later symbolized world harmony
 Succubus, a female demon from medieval folklore who seduces men in their dreams to drain their energy, usually through intercourse, originally had a horrific appearance
 Yuki-onna, in Japanese folklore, a spirit who appears on snowy nights as a tall, beautiful woman with long black hair and red lips, originally portrayed as evil

Other uses
 Enchantress Rocks, a small group of rocks lying off Elephant Point on the south side of western Livingston Island in the South Shetland Islands, Antarctica
 Ultima II: The Revenge of the Enchantress, a 1982 computer game
 HMS Enchantress (disambiguation), several Royal Navy ships of the name
 Enchantress (ship), several merchant ships of the name
 Enchantress (pilot boat), 19th-century Sandy Hook pilot boat built in 1851
 Enchantress (yacht), 19th-century racing yacht, winner of national and international races

See also

 Enchanter (disambiguation)
 Enchanted (disambiguation)
 Enchantment (disambiguation)
 Enchant (disambiguation)
 Femme fatale
 Seduction